Sackets Harbor Central School District is an elementary and secondary school district located in Sackets Harbor, New York. It is a small, single-building preschool-12 school of approximately 475 students.

References

Schools in Jefferson County, New York
School districts in New York (state)